Nizhal is an Indian Tamil-language soap opera that airs on DD Podhigai. The show premiered on 15 April 2015 and it airs Monday through Thursday at 9:00PM IST.

Cast
 Pavithra Janani
 Sivan Srinivasan 
 Udhay 
 Sreevidhya
 Sreedhar
 M.B.Moorthy
 A.Revathy
 M.Revathy
 Sethu darwin
 Sabarishwaran
 Meenakshi
 Santhosh
 Bhushmini
 Biran yogesh
 Anu
 Jayaram
 Selva kumar
 Usha priya
 Ramesh

References

External links
 Doordarshan Official Internet site
 Nizhal Serial Facebook

Podhigai TV television series
2015 Tamil-language television series debuts
Tamil-language television shows